This list of cemeteries in Utah includes currently operating, historical (closed for new interments), and defunct (graves abandoned or removed) cemeteries, columbaria, and mausolea. It does not include pet cemeteries.

Beaver County
 Adamsville Cemetery, in Adamsville
 Beaver City Cemetery, in Beaver
 Frisco Cemetery, in Frisco
 Greenville Cemetery, in Greenville
 Milford Cemetery, in Milford
 Minersville Cemetery, in Minersville
 Mountain View Cemetery, in Beaver
 Squire Family Cemetery, 13 km from Newhouse

Box Elder County
 Bear River City Cemetery, in Bear River
 Beaver Dam Cemetery, in Beaver Dam
 Bothwell Cemetery, in Bothwell
 Brigham City Cemetery, in Brigham City
 Call's Fort Cemetery, in Honeyville
 Clear Creek Cemetery, serving Naf, in Cassia County, Idaho
 Corinne Cemetery, in Corinne
 Deweyville Cemetery, in Deweyville
 Early Plymouth Cemetery, in Portage
 East Garland Cemetery, in Riverside
 Elwood Cemetery, in Elwood
 Fielding Cemetery, in Fielding
 Garland Cemetery, in Garland
 Grouse Creek Cemetery, in Grouse Creek
 Honeyville Cemetery
 Howell Cemetery, in Howell
 James Barnet Cole Burial Ground, in Plymouth
 Junction Cemetery, in Lynn
 Kelton Cemetery
 Kimber Ranch Burial
 Lynn Cemetery
 Mantua Cemetery, in Mantua
 Northwestern Shoshoni Tribal Cemetery, in Portage
 Park Valley Cemetery, in Park Valley
 Park Valley Pioneer Cemetery, in Park Valley
 Penrose Cemetery, in Penrose
 Perry Cemetery, in Perry
 Plymouth Cemetery, in Plymouth
 Portage Cemetery
 Riverside Cemetery
 Riverview Cemetery, in Tremonton
 Russian Settlement Cemetery, 11 km south of Park Valley
 Salt Creek Cemetery, SE of Bothwell
 Snowville Cemetery, in Snowville
 Terrace Cemetery, 14 km west of Matlin
 Tyrell Cabin Burials, 6 km north of Grouse Creek
 Valleyview Cemetery, in Thatcher
 Willard City Cemetery
 Willard Pioneer Cemetery, in Willard
 Yost Cemetery, in Yost

Cache County
 Avon Cemetery, in Avon
 Clarkston City Cemetery
 Cornish Cemetery, in Cornish
 Ephraims Grave, 19 km SW of Garden
 Hyde Park Cemetery, in Hyde Park
 Hyrum City Cemetery
 Lewiston City Cemetery
 Logan Cemetery, in Logan
 Mendon City Cemetery
 Millville City Cemetery
 Mount Sterling Cemetery, 4 km south of Wellsville
 Newton Cemetery, in Newton
 North Logan Memorial Park Cemetery, between North Logan and Hyde Park
 Paradise Cemetery, in Paradise
 Poulsen Family Cemetery, 3 km west of Peter (or Petersboro)
 Providence City Cemetery
 Richmond City Cemetery
 Smithfield City Cemetery
 Trenton Cemetery, in Trenton
 Wellsville Cemetery, in Wellsville

Carbon County
 Carbonville Cemetery, in Helper
 Castle Gate Cemetery, in Castle Gate
 Central/Slovenian Cemetery, in Spring Glen
 Cliffview Cemetery, in Price
 East Carbon Cemetery, in East Carbon
 Gorley Cemetery, in Spring Glen
 Haycock Cemetery, in Spring Glen
 Hiawatha Cemetery, in Hiawatha
 Kiz Cemetery, in Sunnyside Junction
 Meade Cemetery, in Price
 Mountain View Cemetery, in Helper
 Price City Cemetery
 Scofield Cemetery, in Scofield
 Spring Glen Cemetery
 Sunnyside Power Plant Cemetery, in Sunnyside
 Valley View Cemetery, in East Carbon
 Wellington City Cemetery, in Wellington
 Whitmore Cemetery, in Price

Daggett County
 Church Cemetery, in Dutch John
 Church Cemetery, in Manila

Davis County
 Antelope Island Army Ranger and Air Force Memorial (not a cemetery)
 Bountiful Memorial Park, in Bountiful
 Centerville Memorial Park, in Centerville
 Clearfield City Cemetery
 Clinton City Cemetery
 Daniel Wood Cemetery, in Bountiful
 Farmington City Cemetery
 Frary Grave Site, on Antelope Island
 Kaysville City Cemetery
 Lakeview Memorial Park Cemetery, between Bountiful and Woods Cross
 Layton Hill Cemetery, between Clearfield and Layton
 Lindquist Memorial Park At Layton Cemetery, NE of Layton
 Sessions Settlement Pioneer Cemetery, in Woods Cross
 South Weber Cemetery, 3 km south of Washington Terrace
 Syracuse Cemetery, in Syracuse
 West Point Cemetery, in West Point

Duchesne County
 Altamont-Mount Emmons Cemetery, 2 km west of Altamont and Mount Emmons
 Altonah Cemetery, in Altonah
 Bluebell Cemetery, in Bluebell
 Boneta-Mountain Home Cemetery, 9 km west of Altamont and Bluebell
 Bridgeland Cemetery, in Bridgeland, 14 km west of Myton
 Cedarview Cemetery
 Duchesne City Cemetery
 Fruitland Cemetery, in Fruitland
 Greenhalgh Cemetery, 4 km north of Neola
 Ioka Cemetery, 6 km north of Myton
 Monarch Cemetery, 2 km west of Neola
 Myton Cemetery, in Myton
 Neola Cemetery, in Neola
 Old Loka Cemetery, 9 km NW of Myton
 Roosevelt Memorial Park, in Roosevelt
 Strawberry Cemetery, 7 km west of Duchesne
 Tabiona-Redcliff Cemetery, 2 km north of Tabiona
 Talmage Cemetery, in Talmage
 Theodore Cemetery, in Duchesne
 Upalco Cemetery, in Upalco
 Utahn Cemetery, 10 km north of Duchesne

Emery County
 Castle Dale City Cemetery
 Clawson Cemetery, in Clawson
 Cleveland Cemetery, in Cleveland
 Desert Lake Cemetery, 6 km east of Elmo
 Elmo Cemetery
 Emery Cemetery, in Emery
 Ferron City Cemetery
 Green River Pioneer Cemetery, in Green River
 Huntington City Cemetery
 Lawrence Cemetery, in Lawrence
 Molen Cemetery, in Molen
 Muddy Creek Cemetery, between Emery and Ferron
 Old Emery Cemetery, in Emery
 Orangeville Cemetery, in Orangeville
 Ridge Cemetery, 3 km east of Emery
 Tucker Family Cemetery, 3 km west of Cleveland
 Victor Cemetery, 3 km SW of Victor
 Wilsonville Cemetery, 7 km east of Castle Dale
 Woodside Cemetery, in Woodside

Garfield County
 Antimony Cemetery, in Antimony
 Boulder Cemetery, in Boulder
 Bryce Canyon City Cemetery
 Cannonville Cemetery
 Escalante Cemetery
 Georgetown Cemetery
 Hatch City Cemetery, in Hatch
 Henrieville Cemetery
 Hillsdale Cemetery
 Loseeville Cemetery, 3 km east of Tropic
 Panguitch City Cemetery
 Spry Cemetery, 11 km north of	Panguitch
 Tropic Cemetery
 Widtsoe Cemetery, in Widtsoe

Grand County
 Andy Swenson Gravesite, 20 km east of Castle Valley and Spanish Valley
 Castle Valley Cemetery, 13 km east of Castle Valley and Spanish Valley
 Castleton Cemetery
 Elgin Cemetery
 Grand Valley Cemetery, 2 km south of Moab
 Red Cliffs Cemetery, 5 km NW of Castle Valley
 Sego Cemetery, in Sego
 Sunset Memorial Gardens Cemetery, 6 km NW of Spanish Valley
 Thompson Springs Cemetery

Iron County
 Cedar City Cemetery
 Enoch Cemetery
 John McGarry Memorial Park Cemetery, 6 km west of Beryl Junction
 Kanarraville Cemetery
 Modena Cemetery
 Newcastle Cemetery
 Paragonah Cemetery
 Parowan City Cemetery
 State Line Cemetery
 Summit City Cemetery, in Summit

Juab County
 Callao Cemetery, in Callao
 Diamond Cemetery, in Diamond
 Eureka Cemetery, in Mammoth Junction
 Fitch Cemetery, in Mammoth Junction
 Levan Cemetery, in Levan
 Mills Cemetery, in Mills
 Mona Cemetery, in Mona
 Nephi City Cemetery, in Nephi
 Pioneer Memorial Park, in Mona
 Rocky Ridge Cemetery, in Rocky Ridge
 Silver City Cemetery, in Silver City
 Swasey Family Cemetery, 2 km west of Mona
 Vine Bluff Cemetery, 2 km north of Nephi

Kane County
 Adairville Cemetery, 23 km west of Big Water
 Alton Cemetery, in Alton
 Angels Rest at Best Friends, 11 km north of Kanab
 Elijah Averett Gravesite, 9 km south of Cannonville, Garfield County
 Glendale City Cemetery
 Harris Cemetery, in Glendale
 Johnson Cemetery, 14 km east of Kanab
 Kanab City Cemetery
 Kanab Pioneer Park Cemetery, in Kanab
 Mount Carmel Cemetery, in Mount Carmel
 Orderville Cemetery, in Orderville
 Pahreah Cemetery, in Pahreah
 Roundy-Johnson Cemetery, 4 km SE of Alton
 Roundy Cemetery, 3 km NE of Alton

Millard County
 Anderson Family Cemetery, Meadow
 Burbank Cemetery, 14 km south of Garrison
 Delta City Cemetery
 Deseret City Cemetery
 Fillmore Cemetery
 Hinckley City Cemetery
 Hockman Cemetery, in Kanosh
 Holden Cemetery
 Kanosh Cemetery
 Kanosh Indian Village, 4 km NE of Kanosh
 Leamington Cemetery
 Lynndyl Cemetery
 McCornick Cemetery
 Meadow Cemetery
 Oak City Cemetery
 Oasis Cemetery
 Scipio Cemetery
 Scipio Pioneer Cemetery, in Scipio
 Sutherland Cemetery
 Talbot Family Cemetery, 3 km east of Leamington

Morgan County
 Croydon Cemetery
 Milton Cemetery, 4 km west of Morgan
 Mountain Green Cemetery
 North Morgan Cemetery, 2 km north of Morgan
 Peterson Cemetery
 Porterville Cemetery
 Richville Cemetery, 4 km south of Morgan
 South Morgan Cemetery, in Morgan

Piute County
 Circleville Cemetery
 Dennis Cemetery, 4 km south of Marysvale
 Harris Cemetery, 2 km north of Junction
 Howes Cemetery, 5 km ESE of Alunite
 Junction Cemetery
 Junction Hill Cemetery, in Junction
 Junction Lower Cemetery, in Junction
 Kingston Cemetery
 Mountain View Cemetery, in Marysvale
 Murrays Cemetery, 2 km north of Marysvale
 Terrace Hill Cemetery, in Junction
 Thompsonville Cemetery, 4 km SSSE of Marysvale

Rich County
 Eastman Family Cemetery, 4 km west of Woodruff
 Garden City Cemetery
 Laketown Cemetery
 Meadowville Cemetery
 Randolph City Cemetery
 Round Valley Cemetery, 6 km SW of Laketown
 Woodruff Cemetery

Salt Lake County
 Alta City Cemetery
 Bingham City Cemetery
 Bluffdale City Cemetery
 B'Nai Israel Cemetery, on the south side of Salt Lake City Cemetery, at 4th Avenue/Center Street
 Brigham Young Family Memorial Cemetery, on 1st Avenue east of State Street in Salt Lake City
 Chandler Cemetery, 3 km WSW of Copperton
 Crescent Cemetery, in Sandy
 Draper City Cemetery
 Elysian Burial Gardens, in Sugar House, Salt Lake City
 Fort Douglas Cemetery, in Fort Douglas
 Granite City Cemetery
 Herriman Cemetery
 Holladay Memorial Park Cemetery, in Holladay
 Kimball-Whitney Cemetery, in northern Salt Lake City, NW of North Temple/State Streets
 Lake Hills Memorial Estates, 3 km west of Sandy
 Larkin Sunset Gardens	Draper, 2 km SSE of Sandy
 Larkin Sunset Lawn Cemetery, in Sugar House, 6 km ESE of Salt Lake City
 Midvale City Cemetery
 Montefiore Cemetery, on the south side of Salt Lake City Cemetery, at 4th Avenue/Cypress Street
 Mormon Pioneer Memorial Monument (not a cemetery)
 Mount Calvary Catholic Cemetery, at the SE corner of Salt Lake City Cemetery, at 4th Avenue/T Street
 Mount Olivet Cemetery, in SE Salt Lake City, at 1300 East/500 South Streets. Set up by Act of Congress
 Mountain View Memorial Estates, in Cottonwood Heights
 Murray Cemetery
 Pleasant Green Cemetery, Magna, Utah. Established 1883
 Redwood Memorial Cemetery, in southern Taylorsville
 Riverton City Cemetery
 Salt Lake City Cemetery, Salt Lake City. Established 1848/49.
 Salt Lake Memorial Mausoleum (AKA City View Mausoleum), in the Avenues of NE Salt Lake City, north of 11th Avenue
 Sandy City Cemetery
 Shaarey Tzedek Cemetery, in the Avenues of NE Salt Lake City
 South Jordan Cemetery
 Taylorsville Memorial Park Cemetery
 Union Fort Pioneer Cemetery, 3 km WSW of Cottonwood Heights
 Utah Veterans Cemetery and Memorial Park, 5.5 km south of Bluffdale
 Valley View Memorial Park, in West Valley City
 Wasatch Lawn Memorial Park, 8 km SSE of Salt Lake City, in Sugar House
 Wasatch Lawn Memorial Park South, 3 km WSW of Riverton
 West Jordan City Cemetery
 Wights Fort Cemetery, 4 km SW of West Jordan

San Juan
 Aneth Area Cemetery, 3 km NW of Aneth
 Blanding City Cemetery
 Bluff Cemetery
 Cedar Point Cemetery, 29 km SE of Monticello
 Hole 'n the Rock Cemetery, 10 km NNW of La Sal Junction
 La Sal Cemetery, in La Sal
 Monticello City Cemetery
 Mountain View Cemetery, 22 km ESE of Monticello
 Saint Christopher's Cemetery, 3 km east of Bluff
 Urado Cemetery, 19 km SW of Dove Creek, Colorado
 Valley View Cemetery, 18 km WNW of Dove Creek, Colorado
 Verdure Cemetery, 10 km south of Monticello

Sanpete County
 Axtell Cemetery
 Centerfield Cemetery
 Chester Cemetery
 Dover Cemetery
 Ephraim Park Cemetery, in Ephraim
 Ephraim Pioneer Cemetery, 3 km north of Ephraim
 Fairview Lower Cemetery, 2 km NW of Fairview
 Fairview Upper Cemetery, 2 km NW of Fairview
 Fayette Cemetery,
 Fountain Green Cemetery
 Freedom Cemetery
 Gunnison Cemetery
 Manti Cemetery
 Mayfield Cemetery
 Moroni City Cemetery
 Mount Pleasant City Cemetery
 Park Cemetery, in Ephraim
 Spencer Cemetery, in Indianola
 Spring City Cemetery, 2 km west of Spring City
 Spring City Pioneer Cemetery, in Spring City
 Sterling Cemetery
 Wales Cemetery
 Yorgason Family Cemetery, in Fountain Green

Sevier County
 Annabella
 Aurora Cemetery
 Burrville Cemetery
 Central Valley Cemetery, 2 km north of Nibley
 East Side Cemetery, in Salina
 Elsinore Cemetery
 Glenwood Cemetery, 2 km north of Glenwood
 Glenwood Pioneer Cemetery, in Glenwood
 Joseph Cemetery
 Koosharem Cemetery
 Monroe City Cemetery
 Pioneer Cemetery, 2 km NE of Salina
 Redmond Cemetery
 Richfield City Cemetery
 Salina City Cemetery
 Sevier Cemetery
 Sigurd Cemetery
 Venice Cemetery
 Vermillion Cemetery

Summit County
 Coalville Cemetery
 Cooper-Hughes-Vickory Cemetery, 9 km WNW of Oakley
 Emory Cemetery, in Emory, 14 km NE from Echo
 Glenwood Cemetery, Park City
 Henefer Cemetery
 Hoytsville Cemetery
 Kamas Bible Church Cemetery, in Kamas
 Kamas Cemetery, in Francis
 Lower Francis Cemetery, 2 km ESE of Francis
 Marion Cemetery
 North Bench/Oakley Cemetery, in Oakley
 Park City Cemetery, 2 km NNW of Park City
 Peoa Cemetery
 Rockport Cemetery
 Seymour/Davis Cemetery, 5.5 km NW of Peoa
 Snyderville Pioneer, in Snyderville
 Stevens Cemetery, in Oakley
 Upper Francis Cemetery, 2 km ESE of Francis
 Upton Cemetery, 15 km ENE of Coalville
 Wanship Cemetery
 Woodland Cemetery

Tooele County
 Chief Green Jacket Grave, 10 km SSE of Vernon
 Clover Cemetery, 2 km WSW of Clover
 Erda Pioneer Cemetery, in Erda
 Grantsville City Cemetery
 Ibapah Cemetery, Ibapah
 Iosepa Settlement Cemetery, in Iosepa, 31 km NW of Rush Valley
 Johnson Cemetery, 9 km SW of Ophir
 Lake Point Cemetery
 Mercur Cemetery
 Ophir Old/New Cemeteries, 3 km WSW of Ophir
 Saint John Cemetery	Saint John
 Stansbury Park Cemetery, Stansbury Park - owned by Stansbury Park Service Agency, located north of Benson Grist Mill.
 Stockton Cemetery
 Tooele Cemetery, Tooele - owned by Tooele City, located in SE Tooele.
 Vernon City Cemetery
 Wendover Cemetery, Wendover

Uintah County
 Avalon Cemetery, 16 km E of Randlett
 Deadmans Grave, 18 km SSE of Jensen
 Dragon Cemetery, in Dragon
 Dry Fork Cemetery, 16 km NW of Vernal
 Fairview Cemetery, 5.5 km W of Vernal
 Fort Duchesne Cemetery, 6 km NNE of Ft. Duchesne
 Gusher Cemetery, 2 km NE of Ft. Duchesne
 Harms Cemetery, 2 km east of Whiterocks
 Hayden Cemetery, 6 km ESE of Neola
 Jensen Cemetery
 Lapoint Cemetery
 Leota Cemetery, in Leota, 12 km NNE of Ouray
 Maeser Fairview, in Maeser
 Randlett Cemetery
 Reeds Cemetery, 6.6 km NNW of Whiterocks
 Rock Point Cemetery, 2 km NNE of Maeser
 Tridell Cemetery
 Uintah and Ouray Indian Cemetery, 2 km NW of Fort Duchesne
 Vernal Memorial Park
 White Rocks Cemetery

Utah County
 East Lawn Memorial Hills, Provo, Utah – Privately owned cemetery by the Grow Family in the hills of Utah County overlooking Utah Valley.
 Provo City Cemetery, Provo, Utah – This cemetery is publicly owned and operated by Provo City. 
 Orem City Cemetery, Orem, Utah
 Springville Evergreen Cemetery, Springville, Utah
 Historic Springville Cemetery, Springville, Utah
 Spanish Fork City Cemetery, Spanish Fork, Utah
 Lehi City Cemetery, Lehi, Utah
 Lindon City Cemetery, Lehi, Utah
 Temple Hill Cemetery, Provo, Utah (Defunct)
 Fort Utah Cemetery, Provo, Utah (Defunct)
 Grandview Hill Cemetery, Provo, Utah (Defunct)
 Christmas Tree Cemetery, Provo, Utah (Defunct)
 Alpine City Cemetery, Alpine, Utah
 American Fork City Cemetery, American Fork, Utah
 Benjamin Cemetery
 Cedar Fort
 Colton Cemetery
 Eagle Mountain City Cemetery, Eagle Mountain, Utah
 Elk Ridge City Cemetery, Elk Ridge, Utah
 Fairfield City Cemetery
 Forest City Graveyard
 Genola City Cemetery
 Goshen City Cemetery
 Highland City Cemetery
 Mapleton City Cemetery
 Mill Fork
 Payson City Cemetery
 Pleasant Grove City Cemetery
 Salem City Cemetery
 Santaquin City Cemetery
 Soldier Summit Cemetery
 Spring Lake
 Spring Lake Cemetery
 Tucker Cemetery

Wasatch County
 Center Creek Cemetery, in Center Creek, 5.5 km SE of Heber
 Charleston Cemetery, in Charleston
 Heber City Cemetery
 Midway City Cemetery
 Mound City Cemetery, in Mound City, 2 km NW of Midway
 Soldier Summit Cemetery
 Wallsburg Cemetery, in Wallsburg
 William Walter Wilson Burial Site, 2 km WNW of Interlaken

Washington County
 Central Cemetery, in Central, Utah, 11 km WNW of Pine Valley
 Duncan's Retreat, 5.5 km ESE of Virgin
 Enterprise City Cemetery
 Grafton Cemetery, in Grafton, 4 km west of Rockville
 Gunlock Cemetery, in Gunlock
 Hamblin Cemetery, 11 km ESE of Enterprise
 Harrisburg Cemetery, in Harrisburg, Utah, 4.3 km SW of Leeds
 Hebron Cemetery, in Hebron, 9.7 km WNW of Enterprise
 Hilltop Cemetery, in Springdale
 Holt Cemetery, 7.6 km east of Enterprise
 Hurricane City Cemetery
 Ivins City Cemetery
 La Verkin City Cemetery
 Leeds Cemetery
 Mountain Meadows Massacre Memorial, 6.6 km NNW of Central
 New Harmony Cemetery
 Old Alexander Cemetery, in Washington UT
 Pine Valley Cemetery
 Pinto Cemetery
 Pintura Cemetery, in Pintura
 Rockville Cemetery
 Saint George City Cemetery
 Santa Clara Cemetery
 Shivwits Paiute Indian Cemetery, in Shivwits
 Shunesburg Cemetery, in Shunesburg, 4 km SSE of Springdale
 Silver Reef Catholic Cemetery, in Leeds
 Silver Reef Protestant Cemetery, in Leeds, 0.3 km east of SR Catholic Cemetery
 Springdale City Cemeter
 Tonaquint Cemetery, 3 km SSW of Saint George
 Toquerville Cemetery
 Veyo Cemetery, in Veyo, 9.3 km SW of Central
 Virgin Cemetery
 Washington City Cemetery
 Winsor Memorial Cemetery, in Enterprise

Wayne County
 Aldrich Cemetery, 24 km east of Torrey
 Bicknell Cemetery
 Caineville Cemetery, in Caineville
 Crowther Gravesite, 9 km SW of Caineville
 Esther Fenn Gravesite, in Notom, 13 km ESE of Fruita
 Fremont Cemetery, in Fremont
 Giles Cemetery, 11 km WSW of Hanksville
 Grover Cemetery, in Grover, 9.7 km SE of Torrey
 Hanksville Cemetery, 3 km NE of Hanksville
 Loa Cemetery, in Loa
 Lyman Cemetery, 2 km WSW of Lyman
 Notom Cemetery, 2 km north of Notom, 26 km east of Torrey
 Teasdale Cemetery, in Teasdale, 5 km WSW of Torrey
 Torrey Cemetery, in Torrey
 Torrey Cemetery, 2 km east of Torrey
 Town Point Cemetery, 15 km west of Hanksville

Weber County
 Abbey of the Holy Trinity Cemetery, 5.5 km ESE of Huntsville
 Aultorest Memorial Park, in Ogden
 Ben Lomond Cemetery, in North Ogden
 Evergreen Memorial Park, 5 km NNE of Ogden
 Hooper Cemetery
 Huntsville Cemetery, 3 km west of Huntsville
 Liberty Cemetery, in Liberty
 Meadow View Cemetery, in Eden
 Memorial Gardens of the Wasatch, 2 km NNW of Uintah
 Mountain View Cemetery, in Eden
 Ogden City Cemetery
 Plain City Cemetery
 Roy City Cemetery
 Uintah Town Cemetery, 2 km west of Uintah
 Warren Cemetery, 5.5 km WSW of Plain City
 Washington Heights Memorial Cemetery, in South Ogden
 West Warren Cemetery, 7.6 km SW of Plain City
 West Weber-Taylor Cemetery, 2 km south of Plain City

References

Utah

Utah geography-related lists